Vita Palamar (born 12 October 1977 in Khmelnytskyi, Soviet Union) is a female high jumper from Ukraine.

Career
Her personal best jump is 2.01 metres, achieved in Zürich in August 2003. She set an indoor best of 1.96 m to win the Hochsprung mit Musik in 2001.

On 17 November 2016, the IOC disqualified Palamar from the 2008 Olympic Games and struck her results from the record for failing a drugs test in a re-analysis of her doping sample from 2008.

In May 2017, she was disqualified for two years.

Achievements

See also
Female two metres club

References

External links

1977 births
Living people
Ukrainian female high jumpers
Athletes (track and field) at the 2000 Summer Olympics
Athletes (track and field) at the 2008 Summer Olympics
Olympic athletes of Ukraine
Doping cases in athletics
Ukrainian sportspeople in doping cases
Universiade medalists in athletics (track and field)
Goodwill Games medalists in athletics
Universiade gold medalists for Ukraine
Medalists at the 2001 Summer Universiade
Competitors at the 2001 Goodwill Games
Sportspeople from Khmelnytskyi, Ukraine